The São Toméan Football Federation ( — FSF) is the governing body of football in São Tomé and Príncipe. It was founded on July 11, 1975, affiliated to FIFA and to CAF in 1986. It organizes the national football league and the national team.

Its headquarters is located in the city of São Tomé at Rua João de Deus, its postal code is 440.

External links 
 São Tomé and Príncipe at the FIFA website (archived 13 June 2007)
São Tomé and Príncipe at CAF Online

Sao Tome and Principe
Football in São Tomé and Príncipe
Sports organizations established in 1975
São Tomé